Elephas Mountain is located on the border of Alberta and British Columbia. It was named in 1922 by Arthur O. Wheeler for its resemblance to an elephant's head; Elephas is the Latin word for elephant.

See also
List of peaks on the British Columbia–Alberta border

References

Two-thousanders of Alberta
Two-thousanders of British Columbia
Alberta's Rockies